Tings an' Times is an album by the Jamaican dub poet Linton Kwesi Johnson, released in 1991. It was Johnson's first album in six years. Tings an' Times also served as the title of a book of Johnson's poetry.

Production
The album was produced by Johnson and Dennis Bovell. Johnson was again backed by the Dub Band, with the sound fleshed out by the addition of accordion and violin.

Critical reception

Robert Christgau wrote that "the riddims skip by on Dennis Bovell's ska-speedy tempos, graced with tricky guitar hooks and colored with fiddle and accordion that sing Hungary and Algeria and Colombia and the Rio Grande." The Los Angeles Times lamented that "Johnson’s delivery is both tentative and buried a bit in the mix, lessening the impact." The Orlando Sentinel opined that "Johnson's thoughtful lyrics float over gorgeous elongated reggae tracks flavored with jazz-influenced horns, accordion, piano, violin and flute."

AllMusic thought that Johnson's "outlook is intensely African, and his socio-political lyrics (some in English, some in an African language) are a passionate call for democracy in Africa." The Spin Alternative Record Guide praised the "increased doses of joy and irony in LKJ's meditations." Trouser Press deemed Tings an' Times "an upbeat but stringently critical album that is at once traditional and modern."

Track listing

Personnel
Linton Kwesi Johnson - vocals, percussion, production
The Dub Band
John Kpiaye - guitar
Dennis Bovell - bass, percussion, production, engineer, mixing
Nick Straker - keyboards
Paget King - organ, piano, synthesizer
Henry Holder - piano
Paul Blake - drums
Everald Forrest, Jeff Scantlebury - percussion
Steve Gregory - tenor saxophone, flute
Paul Spong - trumpet
Fayyaz Virji, Henry Tenyue - trombone
Ian Hill - accordion
Johnny "T" Taylor - violin
Technical
Antonio Vignocchi - cover painting

References

Linton Kwesi Johnson albums
1991 albums
Shanachie Records albums